Equifinality is the principle that in open systems a given end state can be reached by many potential means. The term and concept is due to Hans Driesch, the developmental biologist, later applied by Ludwig von Bertalanffy, the founder of general systems theory, and by William T. Powers, the founder of perceptual control theory. Driesch and von Bertalanffy prefer this term, in contrast to "goal", in describing complex systems' similar or convergent behavior. Powers simply emphasised the flexibility of response, since it emphasizes that the same end state may be achieved via many different paths or trajectories.
In closed systems, a direct cause-and-effect relationship exists between the initial condition and the final state of the system: When a computer's 'on' switch is pushed, the system powers up.  Open systems (such as biological and social systems), however, operate quite differently.  The idea of equifinality suggests that similar results may be achieved with different initial conditions and in many different ways. This phenomenon has also been referred to as isotelesis (from Greek ἴσος isos "equal" and τέλεσις telesis: "the intelligent direction of effort toward the achievement of an end") when in games involving superrationality.

Overview
In business, equifinality implies that firms may establish similar competitive advantages based on substantially different competencies.

In psychology, equifinality refers to how different early experiences in life (e.g., parental divorce, physical abuse, parental substance abuse) can lead to similar outcomes (e.g., childhood depression). In other words, there are many different early experiences that can lead to the same psychological disorder.

In archaeology, equifinality refers to how different historical processes may lead to a similar outcome or social formation.  For example, the development of agriculture or the bow and arrow occurred independently in many different areas of the world, yet for different reasons and through different historical trajectories.  This highlights that generalizations based on cross-cultural comparisons cannot be made uncritically.

In Earth and environmental Sciences, two general types of equifinality are distinguished: process equifinality (concerned with real-world open systems) and model equifinality (concerned with conceptual open systems). For example, process equifinality in geomorphology indicates that similar landforms might arise as a result of quite different sets of processes. Model equifinality refers to a condition where distinct configurations of model components (e.g. distinct model parameter values) can lead to similar or equally acceptable simulations (or representations of the real-world process of interest). This similarity or equal acceptability is conditional on the objective functions and criteria of acceptability defined by the modeler. While model equifinality has various facets, model parameter and structural equifinality are mostly known and focused in modeling studies. Equifinality (particularly parameter equifinality) and Monte Carlo experiments are the foundation of the GLUE method that was the first generalised method for uncertainty assessment in hydrological modeling. GLUE is now widely used within and beyond environmental modeling.

See also 
 GLUE – Generalized Likelihood Uncertainty Estimation (when modeling environmental systems there are many different model structures and parameter sets that may be behavioural or acceptable in reproducing the behaviour of that system)
 TMTOWTDI – Computer programming maxim: "there is more than one way to do it"
 Underdetermination
 Consilience
 Convergent Evolution
 Degeneracy (biology)

References

Publications 
 Bertalanffy, Ludwig von, General Systems Theory, 1968
 Beven, K.J. and Binley, A.M., 1992. The future of distributed models: model calibration and uncertainty prediction, Hydrological Processes, 6, pp. 279–298.
 Beven, K.J. and Freer, J., 2001a. Equifinality, data assimilation, and uncertainty estimation in mechanistic modelling of complex environmental systems, Journal of Hydrology, 249, 11–29.
 Croft, Gary W., Glossary of Systems Theory and Practice for the Applied Behavioral Sciences, Syntropy Incorporated, Freeland, WA, Prepublication Review Copy, 1996
 Durkin, James E. (ed.), Living Groups: Group Psychotherapy and General System Theory, Brunner/Mazel, New York, 1981
 Mash, E. J., & Wolfe, D. A. (2005). Abnormal Child Psychology (3rd edition). Wadsworth Canada. pp. 13–14.
 Weisbord, Marvin R., Productive Workplaces: Organizing and Managing for Dignity, Meaning, and Community, Jossey-Bass Publishers, San Francisco, 1987
 Tang, J.Y. and Zhuang, Q. (2008). Equifinality in parameterization of process-based biogeochemistry models: A significant uncertainty source to the estimation of regional carbon dynamics, J. Geophys. Res., 113, G04010.

Systems theory